The Ruby Palace (Persian: قصر یاقوت) is a palace in Tehran, Iran. Located in eastern Tehran, it was built in 1883 as a residence for Nasereddin Shah Qajar.

At the time of its construction, there used to be a caravanserai, a barracks and a bathhouse in the complex, but only the palace remains today. Overall, it used to have 200 rooms.  At times, it was used as a residence for the Shah when he was hunting, and at other times, it served as the royal kitchen.

It was listed in the national heritage sites of Iran on September 23, 2003, with the number 10412.

References 

Palaces in Tehran
Buildings of the Qajar period
1880s establishments in Iran
National works of Iran